These are the late night schedules for the four United States broadcast networks that offer programming during this time period, from September 2010 to August 2011. All times are Eastern or Pacific. Affiliates will fill non-network schedule with local, syndicated, or paid programming. Affiliates also have the option to preempt or delay network programming at their discretion.

Legend

Schedule

Monday-Friday

Saturday

By network

ABC

Returning series
ABC World News Now
America This Morning
Jimmy Kimmel Live!
Nightline

CBS

Returning series
CBS Morning News
Late Show with David Letterman
The Late Late Show with Craig Ferguson
Up to the Minute

FOX

Returning series:
Encore Programming

Not returning from 2009-10:
Brothers 
Sit Down, Shut Up
The Wanda Sykes Show

NBC

Returning series
Early Today
Last Call with Carson Daly
Late Night with Jimmy Fallon
Poker After Dark
Saturday Night Live
The Tonight Show with Jay Leno

Not returning from 2009-10:
The Tonight Show with Conan O'Brien

United States late night network television schedules
2010 in American television
2011 in American television